Andrea Chahad Guedes Vieira (born 5 February 1971) is a former tennis player from Brazil.

She upset Hana Mandlikova in the first round of the 1989 French Open and reached the third round of that tournament. That November, she reached a career-best ranking of world No. 76. She also represented Brazil in the 1992 Summer Olympics.

WTA career finals

Doubles: 1 runner-up

ITF finals

Singles: 14 (11–3)

Doubles: 21 (13–8)

External links
 
 
 
 
 

1971 births
Brazilian female tennis players
Olympic tennis players of Brazil
Tennis players at the 1992 Summer Olympics
Pan American Games medalists in tennis
Living people
Pan American Games silver medalists for Brazil
Pan American Games bronze medalists for Brazil
Tennis players at the 1991 Pan American Games
Medalists at the 1991 Pan American Games
Tennis players from São Paulo
20th-century Brazilian women
21st-century Brazilian women